Manicouagan Reservoir (also Lake Manicouagan) is an annular lake in central Quebec, Canada, covering an area of . The lake island in its centre is known as René-Levasseur Island, and its highest point is Mount Babel. The structure was created 214 (±1) million years ago, in the Late Triassic, by the impact of a meteorite  in diameter. The lake and island are clearly seen from space and are sometimes called the "eye of Quebec".

Geography

Quebec Route 389 passes the eastern shore of the lake.

The Louis-Babel Ecological Reserve makes up the central part of the island.

Impact structure

Manicouagan Reservoir lies within the remnant of an ancient, deeply eroded impact crater (Impact structure). It is the Earth's sixth-largest confirmed impact structure according to rim-to-rim diameter. Mount Babel is interpreted as the central peak of the crater, formed by post-impact uplift.

1992 radiometric dating has estimated that impact melt within the impact structure has an age of 214 ± 1 million years. A later estimate found an age of 215.4 ± 0.16 Ma. As this is more than 12 million years before the end of the Triassic, the impact that produced the crater cannot have been the cause of the Triassic–Jurassic extinction event.

Multiple impact event claims 
It was suggested that the Manicouagan crater may have been part of a multiple impact event which also formed the Rochechouart impact structure in France, the Saint Martin crater in Manitoba, the Obolon' crater in Ukraine, and the Red Wing crater in North Dakota. David Rowley, a geophysicist, with the University of Chicago, working with John Spray of the University of New Brunswick and Simon Kelley of the Open University, discovered that the five craters appeared to form a chain, indicating the breakup and subsequent impact of an asteroid or comet, similar to the well observed string of impacts of Comet Shoemaker–Levy 9 on Jupiter in 1994. However, more recent work has found that the craters formed many millions of years apart, with the Saint Martin crater dating to 227.8 ± 1.1 Ma. While the Rochechouart structure formed 206.92 ± 0.20/0.32 Ma.

Hydroelectric project 

The Manicouagan Reservoir as it presently exists was created in the 1960s, by flooding the earlier Lake Mushalagan (Mouchalagan) to the west of the central plateau and then-smaller Manicouagan to the east, by construction of the Daniel-Johnson dam. The works were part of the enormous Manicouagan or Manic series of hydroelectric projects undertaken by Hydro-Québec, the provincial electrical utility. The complex of dams is also called the Manic-Outardes Project because the rivers involved are the Manicouagan and the Outardes.

The reservoir acts as a giant headpond for the Manicouagan River, feeding the Jean-Lesage generating station (Manic-2), René-Lévesque generating station (Manic-3), and Daniel-Johnson Dam (Manic-5) generating stations downstream. In the peak period of the winter cold, the lake surface is usually lower, since the turbines run all the time at peak load to meet the huge electrical heating needs of the province. The surface of the lake also experiences low levels in the extreme periods of heat in New England during the summer, since in that period Hydro-Québec sells electrical energy to the joint New England grid and individual utilities in the United States.

See also

Manicouagan Uapishka Biosphere Reserve
List of possible impact structures on Earth
Wembo-Nyama ring structure

References

External links 

 Manicouagan at Earth Impact Database
 Manicouagan Impact Structure at Crater Explorer
 
 
Manicouagan Impact Crater from Space (2019 May 2)
Aurora and Manicouagan Crater from the Space Station (2018 May 29)

Impact craters of Quebec
Triassic impact craters
Manicouagan-Outardes hydroelectric project
Reservoirs in Quebec
Biosphere reserves of Canada
Lakes of Côte-Nord
Impact crater lakes